The complaint tablet to Ea-nāṣir ( 81) is a clay tablet that was sent to ancient Ur, written . It is a complaint to a merchant named Ea-nasir from a customer named Nanni. Written in Akkadian cuneiform, it is considered to be the oldest known written complaint. It is currently kept in the British Museum. The tablet has also become an internet meme.

Description

Content

Ea-nasir travelled to Dilmun to buy copper and returned to sell it in Mesopotamia. On one particular occasion, he had agreed to sell copper ingots to Nanni. Nanni sent his servant with the money to complete the transaction. The copper was considered by Nanni to be sub-standard and not accepted.

In response, Nanni created the cuneiform letter for delivery to Ea-nasir. Inscribed on it is a complaint to Ea-nasir about a copper delivery of the incorrect grade, and issues with another delivery; Nanni also complained that his servant (who handled the transaction) had been treated rudely. He stated that, at the time of writing, he had not accepted the copper, but had paid the money for it.

Acquisition

The tablet was discovered and acquired by Sir Leonard Woolley, leading a joint expedition of the University of Pennsylvania and the British Museum from 1922 to 1934 in the Sumerian city of Ur.

Other tablets 
Other tablets have been found in the ruins believed to be Ea-nasir's dwelling. These include a letter from a man named Arbituram who complained he had not received his copper yet, while another says he was tired of receiving bad copper.

References

Further Reading

External links
 
 
 

Clay tablets
Mesopotamian literature
Middle Eastern objects in the British Museum
Customer service
18th-century BC works
Copper industry
Akkadian inscriptions